Zhongwu may refer to:

Zhang Zhongwu (張仲武, died 849), Tang Dynasty general
Prince Zhongwu of Fenyang (汾陽忠武王, 697–781), Tang Dynasty general
Zhongwu (忠武), the posthumous name of:
Zhuge Liang (181–234), chancellor of the state of Shu Han during the Three Kingdoms period
Han Shizhong (1089–1151), general of the late Northern Song Dynasty and the early Southern Song Dynasty
Chang Yuchun (1330–1369), early Ming Dynasty general